Henri Kass (13 October 1919 – 7 September 1982) was a Luxembourgian racing cyclist. He rode in the 1951 Tour de France.

References

1919 births
1982 deaths
Luxembourgian male cyclists
Place of birth missing